Charline Kyra Mathias (born 23 May 1992) is a Luxembourgian middle-distance runner competing primarily in the 800 metres. She represented her country at the 2015 World Championships in Beijing without advancing from the first round.

Competition record

Personal bests
Outdoor
400 metres – 54.50 (Schifflange 2014)
800 metres – 2:00.35 (Heusden-Zolder 2018) NR
1000 metres – 2:40.09 (Pliezhausen 2018) NR
1500 metres – 4:12.57 (Oordegem 2017) NR
5 kilometres – 17:03 (Trier 2017)
Indoor
400 metres – 55.80 (Luxembourg 2010) NR
800 metres – 2:04.32 (Metz 2017)
1500 metres – 4:15.83 (Kirchberg 2018) NR
3000 metres – 9:29.40 (Saarbrücken 2017) NR

References

External links
 

1992 births
Living people
Luxembourgian female middle-distance runners
World Athletics Championships athletes for Luxembourg
Place of birth missing (living people)
Athletes (track and field) at the 2016 Summer Olympics
Olympic athletes of Luxembourg
European Games competitors for Luxembourg
Athletes (track and field) at the 2015 European Games
Competitors at the 2017 Summer Universiade
20th-century Luxembourgian women
21st-century Luxembourgian women